La Belle Alliance is an inn in Belgium and a notable site during the Battle of Waterloo.

Belle Alliance may also refer to:

 La Belle Alliance Commonwealth War Graves Commission Cemetery, near Ypres, Belgium
 Belle-Alliance-Platz, a previous name for Mehringplatz, a plaza in Berlin, Germany
 Belle Alliance Plantation, Assumption Parish, Louisiana, United States
 Belle Alliance, Louisiana, an unincorporated community in Assumption Parish, Louisiana, United States
 Belle Alliance, a 1980 album by the group Ashra
Belle Alliance (grape), another name for Italian wine and table grape Luglienga
 , several ships

See also
 Battle of Waterloo